William Franklin Whitrock (March 4, 1870 – July 26, 1935) was a Major League Baseball pitcher who played from 1890 to 1896 with four teams. He had a career record of 9-19.

He was born in Cincinnati and died in Derby, Connecticut.

External links

1870 births
1935 deaths
Major League Baseball pitchers
Baseball players from Ohio
Cincinnati Reds players
Philadelphia Phillies players
St. Louis Browns (AA) players
Louisville Colonels players
19th-century baseball players
Springfield, Ohio (minor league baseball) players
Portland (minor league baseball) players
Quincy Ravens players
Cedar Rapids Canaries players
Terre Haute Hottentots players
Mobile Blackbirds players
Memphis Fever Germs players
Grand Rapids Rippers players
Milwaukee Brewers (minor league) players
Indianapolis Hoosiers (minor league) players
Toronto Canucks players
Providence Grays (minor league) players
New Bedford Whalers (baseball) players
Indianapolis Indians players
Lyons (minor league baseball) players
Batavia Giants players
Geneva Alhambras players
Canandaigua Rustlers players
Newark Colts players
Hartford Bluebirds players
Derby Angels players
Jersey City Skeeters players
Philadelphia Athletics (minor league) players
Harrisburg Ponies players